Dragoslav Ražnatović (born 19 April 1941 in Vranje) is a former Serbian basketball player. He represented the Yugoslavia national basketball team internationally.

National team career 
Ražnatović competed for Yugoslavia in the 1964 Summer Olympics and in the 1968 Summer Olympics.

References

1941 births
Living people
BKK Radnički players
Yugoslav men's basketball players
1963 FIBA World Championship players
1967 FIBA World Championship players
Serbian men's basketball players
Serbian basketball executives and administrators
Olympic basketball players of Yugoslavia
Basketball players at the 1964 Summer Olympics
Basketball players at the 1968 Summer Olympics
Olympic silver medalists for Yugoslavia
Olympic medalists in basketball
Medalists at the 1968 Summer Olympics
People from Vranje